Isla Chañaral (sometimes referred to as Isla Chanaral or Chanaral Island) is located 6 km off-shore from the northern Central Chilean coast, some 100 km north of the city of La Serena. Together with Isla Choros and Isla Damas, the island forms the Humboldt Penguin National Reserve, which is administered by the Chilean Forestry Corporation. All three islands support populations of Humboldt penguins, but are also habitat for several other rare and endangered animal species such as the Peruvian diving petrel or the South American marine otter. In recent years the reserve has experienced a strong increase in tourist activities, mainly due to being an important feeding ground in the summer months of different marine mammal species like fin whales, blue whales, humpback whales, and bottlenose dolphins that reside in the waters of the reserve. The local fishermen formed an association in cooperation with the National Tourism Service Sernatur to conduct whale watching activities in a sustainable manner, implementing responsible whale watching guidelines.

Isla Chañaral is the biggest of the reserve's islands. Access to the island restricted by permit only. The island consists of two plateau levels. The main plateau between 50 and 70 meters above sea level is divided into a western and an eastern part by a second high plateau (>100 m). The vegetation of the plateaus differs considerably. While the main plateau is dominated by shrub and cacti the high plateau has a barren appearance with only few small cactus aggregations.

External links and references
Chanaral Island: the biggest Humboldt Penguin Colony in the world
The Humboldt Penguin Colonies at Chanaral Island, Chile
Humboldt penguins from the International Penguin Conservation Web Site

Islands of Atacama Region
Pacific islands of Chile